Blacon railway station was located in Blacon, Cheshire, England and was part of the line between Chester Northgate and Hawarden Bridge. This line was later extended to reach Wrexham and Birkenhead.

History
Blacon station opened on 31 March 1890 by the Manchester, Sheffield and Lincolnshire Railway (later the Great Central Railway). The station had two side platforms and the station master's house. To the east was a brick goods warehouse with freight depot and sidings. The 21-lever signal box, opposite the goods yard, was in use until 6 October 1963. A return to Chester Northgate Station would cost 6d compared to a bus fare of 9d return.

Despite being a busy station, British Railways closed it to passengers on 9 September 1968  as part of the Beeching Axe for the economic modernisation of the British railway network in the mid-1960s. Even with the closure of steelmaking operations at Shotton in March 1980, freight continued to use the line through the station until 20 April 1984. Goods services resumed use of the now single track line on 31 August 1986 before the railway closed completely in 1992.

The station buildings have been demolished, although the nearby road bridge over the former track remains. The trackbed has been replaced by a tarmac road surface, which now provides a cycle path, jogging track and a countryside walkway.

Gallery

Services

References

Sources

Further reading
 – 1962 photo of station building

External links

 Images of the line in its final operating days

Disused railway stations in Cheshire
Former Great Central Railway stations
Railway stations in Great Britain opened in 1890
Railway stations in Great Britain closed in 1968
Beeching closures in England